Ribeira de Pena (Salvador) e Santo Aleixo de Além-Tâmega is a civil parish in the municipality of Ribeira de Pena, Portugal. It was formed in 2013 by the merger of the former parishes Salvador and Santo Aleixo de Além-Tâmega. The population in 2011 was 2,785, in an area of 52.85 km2.

References

Freguesias of Ribeira de Pena